The Sky Sword II (Tien Chien II), or TC-2, is a Taiwanese medium-range, hypersonic, radar guided air-to-air missile. It has an inertial navigation system, a data-link for mid-course guidance and active radar homing for terminal guidance, beyond visual range. It also has ECCM capability and can engage multiple targets. According to Su Tzu-yun, chief executive officer at the Center for Advanced Technology at Tamkang University, they are a cost-effective design which can perform a key role in Taiwan's defense strategy, and substantially offset China's air superiority. Some details of its design were revealed for the first time at the Paris Air Show in 2015.

Development
Development of the Sky Sword II family began during the 1990s.

Service history
In 2017 a Sky Sword II launched by a F-CK-1 during a training exercise failed to ignite and fell into the sea. In 2019 TC-2 was among 117 missiles fired during a training exercise off Taiwan's west coast.

Variants

TC-2N

A ship-launched, surface-to-air version was later developed and designated TC-2N. It began development in 1994, and a ground-based test was first carried out against a low-flying drone in 1997. This development was revealed to the public in 2005 and the intention to make it compatible with vertical launch methods was later announced in 2006. The first ship-based launch was held in mid 2014.

The missile has all-weather capability, is equipped with a thrust-vectoring booster to increase its range as well as maneuverability during launch phase (although early ship-based launch trials were carried out without this feature), and can engage anti-ship missiles and aircraft.  It also has folding control surfaces to be quad-packed into either above-deck oblique launchers or in-deck vertical launch systems.

By May 2021 the TC-2N had passed its live fire trials and operational evaluations. Final evaluation was conducted aboard the Tuo Chiang-class corvette Ta Chiang.

Tuo Chiang-class corvette Ta Chiang(PGG-619) are equipped to carry up to 16 TC-2N.

Yushan-class landing platform dock are equipped to carry up to 32 TC-2N.

TC-2A 
TC-2A is an anti-radiation missile, similar to the AGM-88 HARM. The TC-2A program began soon after the completion of the TC-2. It fills the requirement of the ROCAF for an Anti-Radiation Missile to arm the F-CK-1.

TC-2C 
TC-2C is an advanced air-to-air version first tested in 2017 and intended to replace the standard TC-2. Maximum speed is in the Mach 6 range.

In 2021 it was announced that an extended range version of the TC-2 had been ordered by the Air Force with 250-300 ordered from NCSIST at a unit cost of NT$30 million (US$1.07 million).

Surface-to-Air TC-2 

The land based version of the TC-2N features the missile packaged in a sealed container-launcher. NCSIST has exhibited a truck mounted version with four missile pods. It reportedly retains the midcourse inertial guidance with data link and terminal active radar guidance schemes, as well as an electronic counter-countermeasure (ECCM) capability. Because it lacks the naval version's booster, however, its effective range is reportedly only .

Six batteries with 246 missiles were ordered in 2019.

A TC-2 battery participated in the 2021 Double Ten Day parade.

See also 
 Republic of China Air Force
 Sky Bow
 Sky Sword I

Similar weapons
 PL-12
 AAM-4
 Astra
 R-77
 AIM-120 (and NASAMS)
 RIM-162 ESSM 
 AGM-88 HARM
 Meteor

References

External links 
 TC-2 info on Global Security
 TC-2N test video:

Anti-radiation missiles
Air-to-air missiles of the Republic of China
Surface-to-air missiles of the Republic of China
20th-century surface-to-air missiles
Military equipment introduced in the 1990s